is a Japanese footballer who plays as an attacking midfielder or a winger for Vissel Kobe.

Club statistics
Updated to 19 February 2019.

References

External links

Profile at Vissel Kobe

1997 births
Living people
People from Tokushima (city)
Association football people from Tokushima Prefecture
Japanese footballers
J1 League players
J2 League players
Segunda División B players
CF Peralada players
Vissel Kobe players
Kyoto Sanga FC players
Association football midfielders
Japanese expatriate footballers
Japanese expatriate sportspeople in Spain
Expatriate footballers in Spain